Arka Sıradakiler is the title of a Turkish teen drama series, produced by Birol Guven and directed by Hamdi Alkan. Meaning "those at the back row," name of the series alludes to a group of forsaken students whose experiences comprise the main theme of the storyline. The series began broadcast on September 30, 2007 on Fox (Turkey). It was aired weekly on Sundays at 19:45 (UTC+2) until Season 6, which was aired on TNT (Turkey) on Sundays at 20:00.

Overview

The storyline features experiences of students and teaching staff of a suburban high school named Büyük Zafer High School in which gang fights, racketeering and drug abuse is common. While the students are trying to hold their place in chaos and most of the teachers are desperately getting themselves used to the situation, a new, determined teacher is appointed to the school. Pulling out all the stops, from family problems to psychological issues, he involves himself in every case about students. A typical episode practically analyzes emotional responses of characters to the troubles they face in their relationships with one another.

Episodes 

 In Season 5, title of the series is Arka Sıradakiler Umut.
 Season 6 takes place in an alternate timeline, in which Saffet never chose to save Oktay when he was thrown in the sea by Loran and his men. It reached low ratings due to plot holes and logical errors caused by trying to erase the last two seasons of the series.

Music
Composer Aydın Sarman, who also took on arranging the music of the then upcoming soundtrack album, collaborated with Burcu Güven to score various themes for the series. Style of these themes was largely rock influenced, including frequent electric guitar solos and strong, deep 
vocals performed by Bülent Çidem. Besides his vocals, Burcu Güven's voice is also audible in some of the songs as a backing vocal and a single track is completely performed by Aydın Sarman himself.

Soundtrack album
A soundtrack album of the series was released as the product of nearly a year of work on November 16, 2008. The number of tracks in the album can be accounted as a record for a TV series. Including instrumental tracks as well, the album consists of 22 tracks 11 of which are original. The album has a rich sound which might please not only the Arka Sıradakiler fans but also all the music lovers. Most of the lyrics and composition is created by Aydın Sarman and Burcu Güven again while Bülent Çidem is still the vocalist. The album - with an exception or two - features all of the background music audible in the show. It is also allowed its purchasers to join in a free sweepstakes by applying over the official website of the series. Those who won the sweepstakes gained the right to be one of ten people, who had the chance to meet the performers by getting into the film set. The sweepstakes, first of which was executed on 10 January 2009, were repeated in the 10th day of each month until June 2009.

Track listing

References

External links 
 

2007 Turkish television series debuts
2012 Turkish television series endings
Turkish drama television series
2000s Turkish television series
Fox (Turkish TV channel) original programming
Turkish television series endings
Television shows set in Istanbul
Television series produced in Istanbul